Cyrus S. Gentry (May 14, 1892 – November 2, 1967) was a vice-president and general counsel at Shell Oil. In 1914 he was a Rhodes Scholar from Illinois, attending Oxford University.

Biography
He was born on May 14, 1892 in Eldorado, Illinois to W. C. Gentry. He died on November 2, 1967 in the North Miami General Hospital in Florida.

References

1892 births
1967 deaths
Shell plc people
American Rhodes Scholars